Priidu is an Estonian masculine given name.

Notable individuals named Priidu include:
Priidu Aavik (1905–1991), painter
Priidu Beier (born 1957), poet and teacher
Priidu Isak (born 1957), boxer (et)
Priidu Niit (born 1990), discus thrower (et)

References

Estonian masculine given names